Basudeipur is a village in the Gop block of Puri district, Odisha state of India.

External links

Villages in Puri district